Backchat was a half-hour television show on FX which ran through the mid-1990s right after the network's inception and was hosted by Jeff Probst.

The show consisted of him and two designated letter-readers reading viewer letters and responding on air. At the time, FX's gimmick was the FX Apartment, which the hosts of various TV shows (such as Breakfast Time and Sound FX) would use as a set. Also part of this gimmick was a very high level of interaction with viewers via their letters and e-mails, hence the TV show.

Probst has commented that later in the show's run, he and the writers simply made up letters due to a drought of letters, and that none of the audience was ever able to tell the difference. Backchat was ultimately cancelled as the FX Apartment gimmick was dropped and the network shifted into a secondary network for Fox.

References

FX Networks original programming
1995 American television series debuts
2007 American television series endings
Television shows set in New York City